Henry Augustus Dillon-Lee, 13th Viscount Dillon (1777–1832), was an Irish politician, soldier and writer. Despite being a Protestant, he supported Catholic emancipation in Ireland and wrote on the topic. He sat as MP for Harwich in England in the last parliament of Great Britain and the first parliament of the United Kingdom. In the second parliament of the United Kingdom he sat for County Mayo in Ireland.

He was the colonel of a regiment and wrote on military subjects. He wrote fiction publishing two historical novels.

Birth and origins 

{{Tree chart|CHD14| |TDD15| |AED16|y|ElnAd|boxstyle=border-width: 1px; border-radius: 0.5em;
 |CHD14=CharlesHenry14thViscount|boxstyle_CHD14=border-width: 1px; border-radius: 0.5em; background: lavender;
 |TDD15=TheobaldDominick15thViscount|boxstyle_TDD15=border-width: 1px; border-radius: 0.5em; background: lavender;
 |AED16=ArthurEdmund16thViscount|boxstyle_AED16=border-width: 1px; border-radius: 0.5em; background: lavender;
 |ElnAd='EllenAdderly}}

Henry Augustus was born on 28 October 1777 at Brussels, then the capital of the Austrian Netherlands. He was the eldest son of Charles Dillon-Lee and his first wife Henrietta Maria Phipps. His father was the 12th Viscount Dillon, who had in 1767 conformed to the established religion.

Henry Augustus's mother was the daughter of Constantine John Phipps, 1st Baron Mulgrave. Her family was Anglo-Irish. Thus both parents were Protestants and part of the Protestant Ascendancy in Ireland. They had married in 1776 at Brussels. Henry Augustus had one sister, who appears on the list in his father's article.

 Early life 
Henry Augustus's mother died in 1782 when he was four. In 1787 his father remarried to Marie Rogier of Mechelen, who was an actress in Brussels and had been his mistress before he married Henry's mother. Henry Augustus had three half-siblings, a brother and two sisters, who were born from his fathers second marriage. They are listed in his father's article.

Henry Augustus was brought up by his uncle Constantine Phipps, 2nd Baron Mulgrave. In 1794, when Dillon-Lee (i.e. Henry Augustus) was 17, he was made the colonel of a regiment in the newly created Catholic Irish Brigade, an unlikely employment for a Protestant, that was due to his family's military connection to the Irish Brigade. This Catholic Irish Brigade lasted four years, being dissolved in 1798. On 21 October 1795 Dillon-Lee immatriculated at Christ Church, Oxford.

In 1799, aged 22, he contested and won a by-election caused by the death of Richard Hopkins MP for Harwich Borough, County Essex. This was during the 18th and last parliament of Great Britain, summoned in 1796 to meet at Westminster on 12 July 1796. It continued without a general election as the 1st Parliament of the United Kingdom, 1801–1802. He sat therefore until 29 June 1802 when parliament was dissolved. 

In the general election of 1802 he was elected for one of the two seats for County Mayo in the House of Commons of the United Kingdom.

In 1805 he raised a new regiment in Ireland, called the Duke of York's Irish or the 101st Regiment of Foot. He owned the regiment and hired out its services to the British army under a letter of service.

 Marriage and children 
In February 1807, Dillon-Lee married Henrietta Browne, sister of Dominick, 1st Baron Oranmore and Browne, daughter of Dominick-Geoffrey Browne, by Margaret, daughter of George Browne, 4th son of the 1st Earl of Altamont. The marriage took place at Castle MacGarrett near Claremorris, County Mayo, Ireland. The Brownes of Mayo were an Anglo-Irish, Protestant family.

 
Henry Augustus and Henrietta had ten children:
Henrietta Maria (1807–1896), married Edward Stanley, 2nd Baron Stanley of Alderley, and campaigned for better education for girls
Charles Henry (1810–1865), born in Dublin, died at Ditchley, Oxford; succeeded his father as 14th Viscount
Theobald Dominick (1811–1879), the 15th Viscount Dillon, who died childless and was succeeded by his brother
Arthur Edmund Denis (1812–1892), married Ellen Adderley and succeeded his brother as the 16th Viscount Dillon
Constantine (1813–1853), who emigrated to New Zealand
Robert George Lee (1817–1822), who died young
Margaret Frances Florence (1818–1885), who was a maid of honour to her majesty and married the geologist William Hamilton
Gerald Normanby (1823–1880), married Louisa FitzGibbon, daughter of Richard Hobart FitzGibbons, 3rd Earl of Clare, and changed his surname to hers
Louisa Anne Rose (1825–1902), married Spencer-Cecil Ponsonby of Bessborough
Helena Matilda (born 1827)

 Later life, death, and timeline 
Dillon-Lee's regiment was ordered to Halifax, Nova Scotia, Canada, to where he also took his wife and where his eldest child was born in 1807.

On 9 November 1813 his father died at Loughglinn, County Roscommon, and was buried in the Dillon Vault at Ballyhaunis. Henry succeeded as the 13th Viscount Dillon, at the age of 36.

Lord Dillon, as he now was, lived with his wife and children in Florence, Italy in the late 1810s and in London in the 1820s where he seems to have had an affair with the writer Eliza Rennie. and where he wrote his two historical novels, Maltravers, published in 1822, and Rosaline de Vere, published in 1824.

Dillon died on 24 July 1832 in London and was buried in the All Saints Church at Spelsbury. He was the first Dillon to be buried in Spelsbury. His widow died thirty years later at the Hotel Windsor, Paris, 18 March 1862, aged 73.

 Works 
Dillon's published works include: 
 Short View of the Catholic Question (London: J. Debrett, 1801), 32 pages
 Letter to the Noblemen and Gentlemen who Composed the Deputation from the Catholics of Ireland on the Subject of their Mission (London: J. Budd, Crown and Mitre, 1805), online at Google Books, 56 pages
 A Commentary on the Military Establishments and Defence of the British Empire (Dillon publisher: Printed by Cox, Son, and Baylis ... for E. Kerby, 1811)
 The Tactics of Ælian: Comprising Military Systems of the Grecians (London: E. Kerby, 1814), online at Google Books
 Discourse upon the Theory of Legitimate Government (Florence, 1817), online at Google Books, 89 pages
 The Life and Opinions of Sir Richard Maltravers: an English Gentleman of the Seventeenth Century, Volume 1 (London: G. and W.B. Whittaker, 1822), online at Google Books Corvey CME 3-628-48097-3; ECB 345; EN2 1822: 29; NSTC 2D13576; OCLC 35663915.
 The life and opinions of Sir Richard Maltravers: an English gentleman of the seventeenth century, Volume 2 (London: G. and W.B. Whittaker, 1822), online at Google Books
 Rosaline de Vere, Volume 1 (London: Treuttel and Würtz, Treuttel junior and Richter, 1824), online at Internet Archive Corvey CME 3-628-48547-9; ECB 502; EN2 1824: 29; NSTC 2D13577; OCLC 12423730.
 Rosaline de Vere'', Volume 2 (London: Treuttel and Würtz, Treuttel junior and Richter, 1824), online at Internet Archive

Also: various works of jurisprudence.

Notes and references

Notes

Citations

Sources 

  – Snippet view
 
  – Dacre to Dysart
  – Scotland and Ireland (for Dillon)
 
  – Abbay to Dyson
  – (for timeline)

External links 

 

1777 births
1832 deaths
British MPs 1796–1800
Earls in the Jacobite peerage
Members of the Parliament of Great Britain for English constituencies
Members of the Parliament of the United Kingdom for English constituencies
Members of the Parliament of the United Kingdom for County Mayo constituencies (1801–1922)
UK MPs 1801–1802
UK MPs 1802–1806
UK MPs 1806–1807
UK MPs 1807–1812
UK MPs 1812–1818
UK MPs who inherited peerages
Henry 13